is a Japanese footballer currently playing as a forward for FC Tokyo.

Club career
Nozawa was registered as a type-2 player for the 2021 season with FC Tokyo.

On 14 January 2022, Nozawa was loaned out to J3 club, SC Sagamihara from 2022 season.

Career statistics

Club
.

Notes

References

External links

2003 births
Living people
People from Itabashi
Association football people from Tokyo Metropolis
Japanese footballers
Japan youth international footballers
Association football forwards
J1 League players
J3 League players
FC Tokyo players
FC Tokyo U-23 players
SC Sagamihara players